Allan Henry Hoover (July 17, 1907 – November 4, 1993) was a British-born American mining engineer, rancher, financier, and the younger son of President Herbert Hoover and First Lady Lou Henry.

Early life and education
Hoover was born in London on July 17, 1907. His elder brother was Herbert Hoover Jr. (1903–1969). He was raised in Palo Alto, California, and graduated from Palo Alto High School. His mother was First Lady Lou Henry Hoover, and his father was President Herbert Hoover. He earned a bachelor's degree from Stanford University and also studied towards a master's degree at Harvard Business School before pursuing a career in the banking industry.

Career
For years, Hoover served in foundations and institutions, honoring the Hoover family, such as 50-year leadership of the Hoover Institution at Stanford University. Moreover, he bought his father's birthplace in West Branch, Iowa for $4,500 and turned it into the Herbert Hoover Presidential Library and Museum. He also served his interests worldwide in mining, agriculture, and financing.

Personal life 
He was married to Margaret Coberly Hoover with whom he had two sons, Andrew and Allan Jr., and a daughter, Lou Henry. His grand-daughter (via Andrew) is Margaret Hoover. In his retirement, Hoover split his time between the San Francisco Bay Area and Greenwich, Connecticut.

He died in Portola Valley, California, on November 4, 1993. His funeral was held in West Branch, Iowa.

References

External links 
 Hoover Genealogy at National Park Service

1907 births
1993 deaths
American ranchers
American financiers
Children of presidents of the United States
Stanford University alumni
Harvard Business School alumni
Herbert Hoover
Hoover family
People educated at Gibbs School
Palo Alto High School alumni
American expatriates in the United Kingdom